Grant Phillip Hodnett (born 17 August 1982) is a South African-born English cricketer, who holds a British passport from birth and qualified to play for England through residency. Hodnett is a right-handed batsman who bowls leg break. He was born in Johannesburg, Transvaal Province and educated at Northwood High School in Durban.

Hodnett appeared for the Gloucestershire Cricket Board in the 2002 MCCA Knockout Trophy, after impressing for Cheltenham Cricket Club, he was signed by Gloucestershire for the 2005 season. He made his debut in a first-class match against Warwickshire in the 2005 County Championship. The following season he made his List A debut against Sussex in the 2006 Cheltenham & Gloucester Trophy, while the 2007 season saw Hodnett gain an extended run in Jon Lewis' County Championship team, making fifteen appearances in that season, Hodnett scored 886 first-class runs in this season, which came at an average of 36.91, with a high score of 168. He also made his last three List A appearances for Gloucestershire in the 2007 season during the Friends Provident Trophy. He scored 114 runs in his four List A matches for the county, which came at an average of 28.50, while he made a single half century with a score of exactly 50 against Somerset.

However, in 2008 Hodnett lost his place in the Gloucestershire side, after which he admitted he was suffering from severe depression. He sought treatment for the condition from sports psychologist Brian Copley (who had also helped Marcus Trescothick through his depression). He returned for the 2009 season having missed much of the previous season and made his Twenty20 debut against Worcestershire in the Twenty20 Cup. He made three further matches in the competition, in his final appearance against Northamptonshire, Hodnett scored 60 runs from 46 balls.

Back in his native South Africa, Hodnett made two List A appearances in October 2010 for KwaZulu-Natal against North West and South Western Districts in the CSA Provincial One-Day Competition.

In February 2012, Hodnett made his first-class debut for KwaZulu-Natal against Gauteng in Durban. During that 2011/12 season he made 4 first-class appearances with a highest score of 57 versus North West at Potchefstroom as well as 4 List A appearances.

Hodnett was the listed professional for Bamford Fieldhouse Cricket Club for the 2011, 2012, 2013 seasons, a cricket club in Manchester. He has played in the KwaZulu-Natal Premier League, winning the batsman of the year award 3 years out of 4 seasons. For Bamford he has hit 5 double centuries and has 5 Lancashire Cup centuries and ECB national ko hundred to his credit.

In 2013 Hodnett had Trials for Leicestershire County Cricket Club scoring 2 half centuries in his 2 appearances.

Hodnett was the listed professional for Moorside Cricket Club from 2014 - 2016, and broke a 30-year-old record when he scored his 6th double hundred in the SADCL and first for Moorside. Interested in a fresh challenge Hodnett left his role at Moorside Cricket Club and signed for Cheshire Premier League side Timperley Cricket Club as their listed player/coach. Hodnett played for the Cheshire Premier League outfit Timperley Cricket Club from 2017 to 2019 scoring 9 hundreds.

In September 2020 at Warrington Magistrates' Court, Hodnett was sentenced to 24 weeks in prison suspended for two years and was ordered to complete a two-year community service order, having been found guilty of a charge of stalking involving serious alarm or distress against a former girlfriend. The court also approved a restraining order preventing Hodnett from contacting the defendant and ordered him to pay court costs.

References

External links

1982 births
Living people
Cricketers from Johannesburg
English sportspeople of South African descent
English cricketers
Gloucestershire Cricket Board cricketers
Gloucestershire cricketers
KwaZulu-Natal cricketers
English cricketers of the 21st century